Limburgse vlaai (Limburgish: vlaai, vlaoj or flaai. Plural: vlaaien)  is a pastry consisting of dough and a filling, traditionally associated with the provinces of Limburg found both in the Netherlands and Belgium, as well as parts of Germany across the border.  

Variations exist throughout the Netherlands, Belgium, and areas of the German state North Rhine-Westphalia near the border with the Netherlands. A vlaai is usually 26—31 centimetres in diameter. It is available in many different varieties of fruit fillings, such as cherry, apricot, strawberry, and plum. Other variations are a crumbled butter and sugar mix ("greumellevlaai" in Limburgish, or "kruimelvlaai" in Dutch) and a cooked rice and custard porridge ("rijstevlaai").

Vlaai is often eaten on special occasions and for significant life events, particularly in the Dutch province of Limburg, such as birthdays and funerals. When eaten on the occasion of a funeral, the vlaai is typically made with black plum ("Zwarte pruimenvlaai").

History 
There is little known about the history of vlaaien that can be said for sure, except that they're not a purely Limburgish pastry. 

One legend asserts that vlaiien dates back to before the 12th century. According to a mention in the chronicle of the abbey of Sint-Truiden (the extant copy dates to 1503), Duke Henry van Leuven laid siege to the city (located in modern-day Belgium in 1189. "Honest and prudent eunuchs and burghers of the town" offered him "Plăcintă" (as it was rendered in medieval Latin) that was baked following old local recipes. Supposedly, this persuaded Henry to give up the siege. "Placenta" is equated with the Middle Dutch word "vlade" but the legend is not otherwise verified, nor can it be certain exactly what baked goods might have been offered.

The "manuscript Gent KANTL", a Middle Dutch cookbook from the 15th century, lists several fillings for "vlade" which resemble fillings of either fruit or custard, as well as a hot water crust pastry recipe for vlade. It is not clear from the text alone whether the vlade recipes would have been put in a crust and one of them specificaly mentions filling a bowl - vla in modern Dutch refers to flan or pudding. However, it also lists pies (tarten) with apple or cherry filling that are specificaly baked in bread (broot), which bear a stronger resemblance to modern vlaai.

Until the mid-20th century the vlaai was considered a luxury item in Limburg that would only be eaten during celebrations. In the countryside they were almost always baked by the people themselves, usually in traditional bakehouses. The vlaaien would be served around four in the afternoon during the coffee break, with usually two or three different slices per person. Because of the growing economic prosperity after the second World War, people started eating them more often.

The vlaaien began to be more widely known outside of Limburg during the late 19th century mostly because of growing tourism in Dutch Southern Limburg. Many tourists took a vlaai back home from local bakers. In 1986 the first vlaaien shop opened in Amsterdam. The selling of vlaaien by several supermarket chains also helped in popularizing the pastry. Maria Hubertina Hendrix, also known as 'Antje van de Stasie', also helped spread the popularity outside of Limburg. In the early 20th century she sold her 'Weerter vlaaitjes' at the train station in Weert, and this caused the pastry to become well known by travellers from all over the Netherlands. After a while the Weerter vlaaien were also sold in Nijmegen. She has had a statue in Weert since 1988.

Geographical indication
On 17 November 2022, the Netherlands and Belgium applied for protection of the designation Limburgse vlaai as a Protected Geographical Indication (PGI) in the European Union.

Notes 

Dutch cuisine
Limburgian cuisine
Fruit pies
Weert